Gay Gooners is Arsenal FC's official supporters' group for LGBT+ fans, formed with the aim of fighting homophobia in football. They are the first and largest LGBT+ fans group in England, with over a thousand of members in the UK and overseas. Gay gooners is a social group that provides a safe space for LGBT Arsenal fans to come together and attend games as one. The formation of Gay gooners encouraged other football teams in the UK to start their very own dedicated clubs tailored to gay supporters

History
Gay gooners was founded in February 2013 by Stewart Selby. Carl Fearn and Joe White who are founding members and co-chairs, lead the group. Gay Gooners have three clear objectives: they exist first and foremost as an Arsenal fan group, operate politically, working with organizations such as Rainbow Laces and Kick It Out to raise awareness of homophobia in the game; and they have taken on the role of public figureheads for LGBT football fandom. 

In June 2014, Gay gooners became the first LGBT supporters group to participate in the London Pride.

References

Arsenal F.C.
Association football supporters
LGBT sports organisations in the United Kingdom
2013 establishments in England